The William Henry and Lucinda McCaslin Farm House is a single-family home located at 15237 McCaslin Lake Road in Linden, Michigan. It was listed on the National Register of Historic Places in 1982.

History
William Henry McCaslin was born in Cork County, Ireland and came to the United States in 1838, settling in this area of southeastern Genesee County. The lake near McCaslin's land is now known as McCaslin Lake. McCaslin had five children with his wife, Lucinda. In the 1850s, they began construction on a house ion their property. However, William McCaslin died in 1858 by falling from a barn, and construction stalled. In 1861, Lucinda hired a contractor named Dick Gibbons for $1,000 to finish the home.

Description
The William Henry and Lucinda McCaslin Farm House is a two-story frame structure built in an L-shaped configuration. The main section of the house is two stories high, and the attached ell is a single story. The front facade of the house has an entry door with a classical surround, symmetrical window openings, and corner pilasters. Both sections of the house have a wide frieze below the eavesline and boxed cornices with returns.

References

		
National Register of Historic Places in Genesee County, Michigan
Greek Revival architecture in Michigan
Residential buildings completed in 1861